Micka is a Czech surname. Notable people with the surname include:

Daniel Micka (born 1963), Czech writer and translator from English
 Edward Micka (1915–1942), officer of United States Navy, a Navy pilot, recipient of the Navy Cross
 USS Micka (DE-176), named in his honor
 Jan Micka (born 1995), Czech swimmer
 Mike Micka (1921–1989), American football player
 Tomáš Micka (born 1983), Czech ice hockey player

See also
 Mica (disambiguation)

Czech-language surnames